Denny Wahyudi (born 29 August 1977), commonly known as Denny Cagur, is an Indonesian actor, comedian and presenter. He first came into the public eye in 1997 as a member of the comedy group The Cagur Band, with Wendy Armoko and Narji.

Career
Wahyudi began his debut career in 1997 as a comedian in the group The Cagur Band, with Wendy Cagur and Narji Cagur. He appeared in the film Pijat Atas Tekan Bawah with Kiki Fatmala and Saipul Jamil in 2009. He has worked on many television shows, including Chatting, Cagur Naik Bajaj, Follow Cagur, Campur-Campur, Saatnya Kita Sahur, Waktunya Kita Sahur, Comedy Project, Raden Ayu, and Lawan Tawa. He has appeared on the music show Dahsyat (2010–present) and comedy show Yuk Keep Smile (2013–2014) and hosts the dance show Bang Jali Dance.

Wahyudi was nominated at the 2014 Dahsyatnya Awards in the category "Outstanding Dangdut Singer". Wahyudi had awarded for "Favourite Comedian" at the Panasonic Gobel Awards in twice times (2014 and 2016) and the 2014 Nickelodeon Indonesia Kids' Choice Awards, "Most Exciting Comedian" at the Global Seru Awards, and "Most Romantic Couple" at the 2014 YKS Romantic Awards.

Personal life
Wahyudi was born on 29 August 1977, in Bandung, West Java. He is an alumnus of Jakarta State University and is the first son of Rojali and Eny. He married Santi Widihastuti on 15 January 2006, and they have one son.

Filmography

Film

Television

Film Television

Discography

Single

TV commercials

Awards and nominations

References

External links
 Situs pribadi Denny Cagur
 Profil Denny Cagur di wowkeren.com
 Profil Denny Cagur di uniqpost.com

Living people

1977 births

People from Bandung
Male actors from West Java
Indonesian male comedians
Indonesian comedians
Indonesian television presenters
Jakarta State University alumni